The 1970/71 NTFL season was the 50th season of the Northern Territory Football League (NTFL).

Darwin have won there 18th premiership title while defeating St Marys in the grand final by 48 points.

Grand Final

References

Northern Territory Football League seasons
NTFL